The Eastern Nilotic languages are one of the three primary branches of the Nilotic languages, themselves belonging to the Eastern Sudanic subfamily of Nilo-Saharan; they are believed to have begun to diverge about 3,000 years ago, and have spread southwards from an original home in Equatoria in South Sudan.  They are spoken across a large area in East Africa, ranging from Equatoria to the highlands of Tanzania.  Their speakers are mostly cattle herders living in semi-arid or arid plains.

Classification
According to Vossen (1982), the Eastern Nilotic languages are basically classified as follows by the comparative method. Vossen (1982) also provides a reconstruction of Proto-Eastern Nilotic.

Eastern Nilotic
Bari languages
 Teso–Lotuko–Maa:
Teso–Turkana (or Ateker; incl. Karimojong)
Lotuko–Maa:
Lotuko languages
Lango language
Lopit language
Lokoya language
Lotuko language
Dongotono language
Ongamo–Maa
 Ongamo language
 Maa languages
 Maasai language (see also Mukogodo-Maasai)
 Camus language
 Samburu language (see also Elmolo-Samburu)

It is generally agreed upon that Bari forms a primary branch, but lower-level splits are less clear.

Swadesh approach (Vossen 1982)
Vossen's classification using the Swadesh approach is as follows (Vossen 1982:114).
Eastern Nilotic
Bari languages
Mondari
Kakwa
Nyanggwara
Kuku
Pöjulu
Ngyepu
Bari
Lotuko–Maa languages
Lotuko languages
Lopit, Dongotono
Lotuko, Lokoya
Ongamo–Maa languages
Ongamo
Maasai
Camus, Samburu
Teso–Turkana languages
Teso
Nyangatom
Turkana, Karimojong

Gleason approach (Vossen 1982)
Vossen's classification using the Gleason approach is as follows (Vossen 1982:119).
Eastern Nilotic
Bari languages
Kuku, Ngyepu
Pöjulu
Kakwa
Bari
Nyanggwara, Mondari
Lotuko languages
Lopit, Dongotono
Lotuko, Lokoya
Teso–Turkana languages
Nyangatom
Teso
Turkana, Karimojong
Ongamo–Maa languages
Ongamo
Maasai
Camus, Samburu

Gender Marking
Gender marking through prefixes (or proclitics) on nouns is an innovation in the Eastern Nilotic languages that is not found in the other branches of Nilotic. However, not every Eastern Nilotic language has this feature: for example, Bari does not have it.

Comparative vocabulary
Sample basic vocabulary of Eastern Nilotic languages from Vossen (1982):

See also
Languages of Tanzania
Languages of South Sudan
Serengeti-Dorobo language, of which at least the numeral system is Eastern or Southern Nilotic
List of Proto-Eastern Nilotic reconstructions (Wiktionary)

Footnotes

Bibliography
 Vossen, Rainer. 1982. The Eastern Nilotes: Linguistic and Historical Reconstructions.  Berlin: Dietrich Reimer Verlag.  .

External links
 A Classified Vocabulary of the Turkana in Northwestern Kenya, by Itaru Ohta, 1989.
 Vowel Harmony and Cyclicity in Eastern Nilotic, Eric Bakovic
 The Consequences of Microvariation in Eastern Nilotic, Eric Bakovic